The details of the 2006 All-Japan University Rugby Football Championships (全国大学ラグビーフットボール選手権大会 - Zenkoku Daigaku Ragubi- Futtobo-ru Senshuken Taikai)

This year had a surprise in ending in a draw with both Toshiba Brave Lupus and NEC Green Rockets awarded the title honours.

Qualifying Teams 

 Top League Microsoft Cup Finalists - Sanyo Wild Knights, Toshiba Brave Lupus
 Top League Third and Fourth - NEC Green Rockets, Toyota Verblitz
 All Japan University Rugby Championship - Kanto Gakuin University, Waseda University
 Japan Rugby Club Champion - Tamariba Club
 Top Challenger Series - Coca-Cola West Japan

Knockout stages

First round

Quarter finals

Semi finals

Final 

Toshiba Brave Lupus and NEC Green Rockets were both awarded the title honours.

See also 
 Rugby union in Japan

All-Japan Rugby Football Championship
2005–06 in Japanese rugby union
Japan